HarbourFront Bus Interchange is located within HarbourFront along Seah Im Road off Telok Blangah Road in Bukit Merah planning area, Singapore. The interchange serves the nearby residential estates of Telok Blangah and Bukit Purmei and also the HarbourFront commercial district, including HarbourFront Centre and VivoCity. The interchange is directly connected to Seah Im Food Centre and HarbourFront MRT station. It is the southernmost bus interchange in Singapore.

History 
The interchange commenced operations on 13 January 1985 with 5 services and was initially named 'World Trade Centre Bus Terminal' until it was subsequently renamed to its present name in 2003, alongside the renaming of the World Trade Centre to HarbourFront.

Bus contracting model

Under the new bus contracting model, all the bus routes buses were split into 6 route packages - 855, 963 and 963e under Sembawang-Yishun, 188 and 188e under Choa Chu Kang-Bukit Panjang, 124 under Bishan-Toa Payoh, 80 under Sengkang-Hougang, 65 under Tampines, and 93 and 123M under Bukit Merah Bus Packages.

References

External links
 Interchanges and Terminals (SBS Transit)
 Interchange/Terminal (SMRT Buses)

Bus stations in Singapore
Bukit Merah
Buildings and structures in Central Region, Singapore